Novak is a village in the municipality of Centar Župa, North Macedonia. The village is inhabited mainly by Turks.

Demographics
The village is inhabited by a Turkish speaking population consisting of Turks.

As of the 2021 census, Novak had 751 residents with the following ethnic composition:
Turks 703
Persons for whom data are taken from administrative sources 45
Others 3

According to the 2002 census, the village had a total of 1,006 inhabitants. Ethnic groups in the village include:
Turks 1,003 
Others 3

References

Villages in Centar Župa Municipality
Turkish communities in North Macedonia